Josiane Castiau (born 19 October 1954) is a French former swimmer. She competed in the women's 4 × 100 metre medley relay at the 1972 Summer Olympics held in Munich, West Germany.

References

External links
 

1954 births
Living people
French female swimmers
Olympic swimmers of France
Swimmers at the 1972 Summer Olympics
Place of birth missing (living people)